The 1880 Drogheda by-election was fought on 2 March 1880.  The byelection, to the United Kingdom House of Commons, arose through the death of the incumbent Home Rule League Member of Parliament, William Hagarty O'Leary.  It was won by Benjamin Whitworth, who had previously sat for the seat as a Liberal but on this occasion announced that he supported the Home Rule cause. He had resigned his current seat, at Kilkenny, in order to run. He received 382 votes as against 181 for J. McCoan, candidate of the Home Rule League. It was reported that 150 Conservative voters had abstained in response to a circular from the party.

References

Drogheda
1880 elections in the United Kingdom
By-elections to the Parliament of the United Kingdom in County Louth constituencies
1880 elections in Ireland